The Honourable Jim is an historical novel by Baroness Orczy and can be thought of as The Scarlet Pimpernel of England.

External links
 

1924 British novels
Historical novels
Novels by Baroness Emma Orczy
Hodder & Stoughton books